Hugh Llewellyn Nichols (March 25, 1865 – December 29, 1942) was an American politician who served as the 32nd lieutenant governor of Ohio from 1911 to 1913 and Chief Justice, Supreme Court of Ohio 1913 to 1920.

Biography

Hugh L. Nichols was born March 25, 1865, at New Richmond, Clermont County, Ohio to parents Perry Jackson and Jeannette Gilmore Nichols. He was educated in the public schools of Batavia, Ohio, and at the Ohio Wesleyan University in Delaware, Ohio, where he was a member of the Chi Phi Fraternity and the Cincinnati Law School. He was admitted to the bar in 1886.

In 1887 Nichols married to Louise Dean Stirling of Batavia, Ohio.

In the Autumn of 1897, Nichols was elected to the Ohio State Senate to represent the 2nd and 4th Districts, (Butler, Warren, Clermont, and Brown County, Ohio), for the 73rd General Assembly, 1898–1899. In the 1898 election, he was nominated by the Democrats for a seat on the Ohio Supreme Court, but lost to Republican William T. Spear. He was a delegate to the 1900 Democratic National Convention, and was Chairman of the Democratic State Executive Committee, where he managed the successful campaign of Governor Harmon.

In 1911, Lieutenant Governor Atlee Pomerene was elected to the United States Senate and resigned. Governor Harmon appointed Nichols to fill the vacancy, and he was re-elected in 1912.

Nichols was appointed September 22, 1913 to the new position of Chief Justice of the Ohio Supreme Court by Governor James Cox, and elected to a full six-year term in 1914, serving until the end of 1920. He lost re-election in 1920.

After defeat in 1920, Nichols founded the Cincinnati firm Nichols, Wood, Marx and Ginter, where he was senior partner until his death.

In 1922, Nichols was appointed chairman of the U. S. Grant Memorial Centenary Association, which directed the restoration of the Grant Birthplace in Point Pleasant, Ohio, and directed the state to acquire it.

On October 19, 1942, Nichols was admitted to Jewish Hospital in Cincinnati with a fractured vertebra. He died there of a coronary thrombosis December 29, 1942, and was buried in Batavia Union Cemetery. He had an adopted daughter, Amy House Nichols, who preceded him in death. He also had

Nichols was a Presbyterian.

References

External links
 

Lieutenant Governors of Ohio
Chief Justices of the Ohio Supreme Court
1865 births
1942 deaths
Ohio Wesleyan University alumni
University of Cincinnati College of Law alumni
Ohio lawyers
Democratic Party Ohio state senators
Politicians from Cincinnati
People from New Richmond, Ohio